Grapholita pallifrontana is a moth species of the family Tortricidae, subfamily Olethreutinae.

Distribution
It is found in most of Europe  and the Near East.

Habitats
These moths live in grassland and scrub, preferably on base soils.

Description
Forewings are brownish, with whitish dorsal blotch and costal markings. Hindwings of the males are infuscate (dark).

Ecology
The larvae feed within seedpods of wild liquorice (Astragalus glycyphyllos). They overwinter in a cocoon. The adult moths fly from May until July.

References

External links
Lepiforum.de
Lepidoptera.se
 Naturhistoriska Risksmuseet

Grapholitini
Moths described in 1846
Moths of Japan
Tortricidae of Europe
Insects of Turkey